Nicktoons MLB is a baseball video game released for the Xbox 360, Wii, Nintendo DS, and Nintendo 3DS platforms. The game was developed by High Voltage Software and published by 2K Play in 2011. It features playable characters from Nickelodeon shows including SpongeBob SquarePants, Invader Zim, The Ren & Stimpy Show, Danny Phantom, Planet Sheen, Avatar: The Last Airbender, Fanboy & Chum Chum, T.U.F.F. Puppy, and two characters that only appear in the 3DS version, one which is from The Adventures of Jimmy Neutron, Boy Genius, and the other from the Nickelodeon game Monkey Quest. Characters from Rugrats, Rocko's Modern Life, Aaahh!!! Real Monsters, Hey Arnold!, The Angry Beavers, CatDog, El Tigre: The Adventures of Manny Rivera, Back at the Barnyard, and The Mighty B! make cameo appearances in the game's loading screens. In addition to Nickelodeon characters, the game also features players from real Major League Baseball teams.

The Nintendo 3DS version has two additional characters and more stadiums and modes. Both console versions allow the player to choose between traditional pad-based controls or motion controls, with the Wii version implementing the former with the Classic Controller and the Xbox 360 version implementing the latter with the Kinect sensor.

Gameplay 
Gameplay of all versions of the game is similar to The Bigs and The Bigs 2. The game contains all the MLB teams along with the all-star teams and fictional Nicktoons teams in standard quick play games 5 Nicktoons characters that have special abilities can be selected by each side. The game only contains 6 fictional Nicktoons ballparks (7 in the 3DS version) and 6 real-life MLB ballparks (8 in the 3DS version) compared to the full MLB ballpark lineups in both The Bigs games.

Reception

Nicktoons MLB has received mixed reviews from critics. Operation Sports gave the game 4 out of 10, stating "As it is, you should only buy this for the Nickelodeon characters or if you are dying to play a Kinect baseball game. Otherwise, just treat yourself and your kids to The Bigs 2, a game with more polish and much more to do. Then, when you are done, watch Spongebob." Official Xbox Magazine gave the game a score of 6.5 out of 10, saying "Nicktoons MLB is fun but frivolous, which should work just fine for kids and families". They also both praised and criticized the usage of Kinect, saying "having your arm angle determine the pitch type is downright genius — though sadly, occasional gaffes (such as seeing swings you didn’t take) muddle the execution".

However, there have been some positive reviews as well. 123Kinect said "If you are buying this for yourself and are older it’s probably around a 6/10, you will notice the flaws, which is why I rated it at 7, it’s one of those on the fence titles. It’s by far no means a real MLB title, however, it’s a step in the right direction." Anime Courtyard also gave it a 7 out of 10, stating "At the end we can say that Nicktoons MLB is not spectacular but not a bad option if you want a baseball game without complications. For children, a good game if they like the Nicktoons. And of course for a grown up who wants a trip on memory lane with their favorite Nickelodeon characters." Nintendo World Report's review gave the game an 8 out of 10, concluding with, "Nicktoons MLB is a simplified but very fun baseball game. Don't let the kid-focused presentation scare you off; this game is worth a look from anyone in the mood for an arcade baseball game.

References

External links
 

2011 video games
2K games
Avatar: The Last Airbender games
Crossover video games
Danny Phantom video games
Kinect games
Baseball video games
SpongeBob SquarePants video games
Invader Zim video games
Major League Baseball video games
Nicktoons video games
Nintendo 3DS games
Nintendo DS games
The Adventures of Jimmy Neutron: Boy Genius video games
The Ren & Stimpy Show video games
Wii games
Xbox 360 games
Aaahh!!! Real Monsters video games
Take-Two Interactive games
Video games developed in the United States
High Voltage Software games
Multiplayer and single-player video games
Black Lantern Studios games